Carbery, or the Barony of Carbery, was once the largest barony in Ireland, and essentially a small, semi-independent kingdom on the southwestern coast of Munster, in what is now County Cork, from its founding in the 1230s by Donal Gott MacCarthy to its gradual decline in the late 16th and early 17th centuries. His descendants, the MacCarthy Reagh dynasty, were its ruling family. The kingdom officially ended in 1606 when Donal of the Pipes, 17th Prince of Carbery chose to surrender his territories to the Crown of England; but his descendants maintained their position in Carbery until the Cromwellian confiscations, following their participation in the Irish Rebellion of 1641 after which some emigrated to the Chesapeake Colonies.

Its modern descendants in name are the baronies of Carbery West and Carbery East, but Carbery once included territories from several of the surrounding baronies as well. To the north/northwest it shared a long and shifting border with the Kingdom of Desmond ruled by the rival MacCarthy Mor dynasty, and to the east/northeast an also shifting border with the vast Earldom of Desmond.

However, despite its small size in comparison to its neighbours, Carbery was one of the very wealthiest principalities in Ireland. This wealth came not, for the most part, from its predominantly rocky lands, but from its numerous excellent harbours, and greatest proximity to France and Spain. Some of the eastern portion of the principality was however quite fertile. The MacCarthys Reagh were reported to have the greatest income of all the Gaelic princes in Ireland. Only the Earls of Desmond, who were intermittently able to force the MacCarthys to pay them tribute in order to avoid continual harassment, were wealthier.

Carbery is fortunate to be very well documented for a medieval Irish principality, the sources being diverse and fairly copious.

In 1621, an Earldom of Carbery was created for John Vaughan, 1st Earl of Carbery, and this became extinct in 1713 with the death of John Vaughan, 3rd Earl of Carbery. Two years later, the barony was granted to the Anglo-Irish politician George Evans, whose descendants still hold the title of Baron Carbery.

Name and founding
Seeds of the later Carbery kingdom began to develop in the 13th century. At 1200, the Uí Chairbre were primarily composed of and ruled by the Uí Donnobhains (now O'Donovans), occupying areas in their historical territory near Adare, Croom and Bruree.  In both 1200 and 1205, MacCarthaigs are recorded as being in conflict with the Uí Chairbre.

At that time the Carbery region was still ruled by the powerful Eóganacht Raithlind in the form of the O'Mahonys, and to a lesser but still notable extent by the even more ancient Corcu Loígde in the form of the O'Driscolls.  By 1232, Donal Gott MacCarthy and his sons had effected a decisive conquest and effected a major change in their territory.  During the remainder of the 13th century, infighting and splintering within the MacCarthaigs led to the establishment of several MacCarthy septs, with territories in Duhallow, Coshmaine, Muscrery and what would become the larger clan lands of MacCarthy Mor and MacCarthy Reagh.  By 1283, one of the MacCarthy splinter groups (and which would ultimately become the sept of MacCarthy Reagh)  was noted as being part of the Ui Chairbre, when Domnall, son of Domnall Cairprech MacCarthaig, and others of the Uí Chairbri made a treacherous plot against Domnall Mac Carthaig, king of Desmond.  The plot failed, and the Uí Chairbre fled, ultimately resettling in Carbery. The many movements of the clans during the 13th century resulted in the relocation of many of the septs in the area, including those of the O'Mahonys, O'Driscolls. The O'Learys of ancient Rosscarbery, close kin to the O'Driscolls, retired northwards to Muskerry sometime around the year 1300.

The source of the naming of the Carberry area has been debated by many scholars, with John O'Donovan arguing it came from the migration of the O'Donovans of Uí Chairbre (and who ignored the MacCarthaig element within the Uí Chairbre), and others, most notably Canon John O'Mahony in his monumental History of the O'Mahony Septs, arguing that the name derived from much earlier (circa 300 AD) rulers, and from whom descended the O'Driscolls and the O'Mahonys and which occupied the region from the 5th or 6th century AD onwards, in Late Antiquity.

History
The history of Carbery for the next three centuries is almost entirely the history of the sept of the MacCarthy Reagh. Less active septs (or for which fewer events were recorded), were the O'Mahonys, the O'Driscolls, and the O'Donovans which had migrated to the Carbery area.

Piracy
The O'Driscolls were Ireland's greatest seafarers and thus were Carbery's most capable pirates, for which they are noted in the sources. The O'Donovans also had some seafaring capability, and are noted for at least a little piracy as well, for which one, along with his O'Driscoll accomplices, was killed in 1551, by the O'Driscoll themselves.

Other families
Leading among the remaining Gaelic families of great note in Carbery were the O'Crowleys, a military family of Connacht origin, an offshoot of the princely MacDermots of Moylurg. They were of verifiable princely extraction and in 1597 were named as the only other lords (freeholders) under the MacCarthys Reagh after the above-mentioned families. Initially brought to Carbery in a war with the Kingdom of Desmond to the north in 1283, they first found themselves in hostile territory. But later they became close vassals of the MacCarthys and were listed among the "followers, cosens and kinsmen" of the famous Florence MacCarthy in 1594. He had charged them to keep his castle of Timoleague for him while imprisoned in the Tower of London. Later they were the leading supporters of his brother Dermod Maol MacCarthy and for this were condemned to have their lands wasted in 1602 by Sir George Carew.

Carbery was also blessed to have a branch of one of Ireland's greatest bardic families of all time, the Ó Dálaigh, or O'Dalys.

The Ó Coileáin (Anglicised: O'Collins, Collins), of County Limerick origin and cousins to the O'Donovans above, are also noted in Carbery, but not as lords or great landholders, although a number were in military service. The majority of them are believed to have belonged to a junior sept of the Uí Choileáin princes of the Uí Chonaill Gabra, who had managed to hold some of their lands in western Limerick for several centuries in spite of the Normans. It is not precisely known when this junior sept arrived in Carbery but it is believed they followed the O'Donovans after both were weakened from the intrusion into the Uí-Fidghente territory of the O'Donovans and the O'Collins circa 1200.  The chief of the O'Collins was killed about 1197, and that of the O'Donovans in 1200, by an alliance of the O'Brians, the MacCarthy and William DeBurgo and other Norman settlers, with both events contributing to a migration to Carbery of parts of their septs during the next century.

Michael Collins, believed his family were descendants of the Uí Chonaill Gabra. They belonged to the minor landed gentry of Carbery, and were situated in very near to O'Donovans country.

Princes of Carbery
The MacCarthy Reagh sept stems from Donal Gott MacCarthy holding the lordship of Carbery which he acquired during his tenure as King of Desmond. Donal Gott had several children. His eldest son, Dermod Don, succeeded him to the lordship upon his death in 1252. Donal Maol MacCarthy, the sixth son of Donal Gott, came into the lordship upon his brother's death in 1262. It was not until 1280 that the territory of Carbery was formally ceded to Donal Maol as an autonomous principality. As such, the family was subsequently regarded as 'Prince of Carbery.' This history is what has contributed to a confusion in the numbering of the "Princes," as some consider Donal Gott the first Prince of Carbery and others more correctly attribute Donal Maol as the first.

 Donal Gott MacCarthy, King of Desmond, Lord of Carbery
 Fínghin Mac Carthaigh - victor at the Battle of Callann
 Dermod Don, Lord of Carbery
 Donal Maol, 1st Prince of Carbery
 Donal Reagh MacCarthy, 5th Prince of Carbery, from whom the sept assumed the agnomen "Reagh".
 Finghin MacCarthy Reagh, 10th Prince of Carbery
 Donal MacFineere MacCarthy Reagh, 12th Prince of Carbery
 Cormac na Haoine MacCarthy Reagh, 13th Prince of Carbery
 Donogh MacCarthy Reagh, 15th Prince of Carbery - father of Florence MacCarthy and Dermod Maol MacCarthy
 Owen MacCarthy Reagh, 16th Prince of Carbery
 Domhnall na bpíob Mac Cárthaigh Riabhach, 17th Prince of Carbery

See also
 Counts of Toulouse
 Donal II O'Donovan
 Sir Fineen O'Driscoll
 Teige-an-Duna MacCarthy
 Donal III O'Donovan
 Carbery's Hundred Isles
 Carbery GAA
 Earl of Carbery
 Baron Carbery

Notes

Bibliography

 Barry, E., Barrymore: Records of the Barrys of County Cork. Cork: Guy and Co. Ltd. 1902. (Reprinted from the Journal of the Cork Historical and Archaeological Society)
 Butler, W.F.T., "The Barony of Carbery", in Journal of the Cork Historical and Archaeological Society, Volume X, Second Series. 1904. pp. 1–10, 73–84
 Sir Richard Cox, 1st Baronet, Carberiae Notitia. 1686. extracts published in Journal of the Cork Historical and Archaeological Society, Volume XII, Second Series. 1906. pp. 142–9
 Donovan, Daniel, Sketches in Carbery, County Cork. Its Antiquities, History, Legends, and Topography. Dublin: McGlashan & Gill. 1876.
 MacCarthy, Samuel Trant, The MacCarthys of Munster. 1922. Summary in French
Moody, Terry (2011). A New History of Ireland. A Companion to Irish History. Oxford University Press. p. 157.
 O'Donovan, John (ed. and tr.), Annála Ríoghachta Éireann. Annals of the Kingdom of Ireland by the Four Masters, from the Earliest Period to the Year 1616. 7 vols. Royal Irish Academy. Dublin. 1848-51. 2nd edition, 1856. Volume VI (appendix)
 O'Donovan, John (ed. and tr.), "The Genealogy of Corca Laidhe", in Miscellany of the Celtic Society. Dublin. 1849. alternative scan
 O'Hart, John, Irish Pedigrees. Dublin: James Duffy and Co. 5th edition, 1892.
 O'Mahony, John, "A History of the O'Mahony septs of Kinelmeky and Ivagha", in Journal of the Cork Historical and Archaeological Society, Volumes 12-16, Second Series. 1906-1910.
 Ó Murchadha, Diarmuid, Family Names of County Cork. Cork: The Collins Press. 2nd edition, 1996.
 Smith, Charles, eds. Robert Day and W. A. Copinger, The Ancient and Present State of the County and City of Cork. Volume I. Volume II. 1750. Cork: Guy & Co. Ltd. 1893.

Baronies of County Cork
Former monarchies of Europe
MacCarthy dynasty
O'Donovan family